Igor Ostashov (3 May 1937 – 01.04.
1998) was a Soviet speed skater. He competed in the men's 10,000 metres event at the 1964 Winter Olympics.

References

External links
 

1937 births
1999 deaths
Soviet male speed skaters
Olympic speed skaters of the Soviet Union
Speed skaters at the 1964 Winter Olympics
Sportspeople from Arkhangelsk